Lansdowne is a cantonment town in Pauri Garhwal  is a district in the Indian state of Uttarakhand.

History
Originally known as Kaludanda after Kalu (Black) and Danda (hills) in Garhwali, Lansdowne was founded and named after then Viceroy of India (1888-1894), Lord Lansdowne in 1887, and by 1901 it had a population of 3943. Lansdowne was developed by the British for catering for the Recruits Training center of the Garhwal Rifles. Lansdowne was a major place of the activities of freedom fighters from British Garhwal during British period. Nowadays, the famous Garhwal Rifles of the Indian Army has its regimental center here.
Lansdowne is one of the quietest hill stations of India and is popular since the British came to India. Lansdowne is unlike other hill stations as it is well connected with motorable roads but remote in its own way. It is situated at an altitude of 1,706 m above sea level surrounded with thick oak and blue pine forests in the Pauri Garhwal district of Uttarakhand state.

On 5 November 1887, the first battalion of Garhwal Rifles migrated from Almora to Lansdowne. Lansdowne was the only city after Almora in the late 1870s. People of different culture and states came to do business in Lansdowne after it became popular. The buildings and church of Lansdowne built during British period, which dates back to the pre-independence period. Lansdowne is an ideal location for eco-tourism as it is well preserved by the Government of Uttarakhand and the Garhwal Rifles. There is a road situated between jaiharikhal and Lansdowne which is called cool road( ठन्डी सड़क) where Indians were not allowed during the British times, it was only meant for Europeans. For the movement of Indians, a parallel road situated below this road was used.

Local attractions
The War Memorial, at the Parade Ground of the Garhwal Rifles Center, is an attraction for the visitors. Prior permission from the military authority has to be obtained. Places of interest around the city include Tip n Top View Point, Kaleshwar Mahadev Temple, which is the most visited Temple in Lansdowne and attracts thousands of devotees during the month of Sawan (Indian Monsoon), Santoshi Mata Temple, Regimental Museum (also called the Darwan Singh Sanghralaya), Bhullatal Lake, St. Mary's Church, and Lover's lane. Excursions from the city can go to the Tarkeshwar Mahadev Temple, Bhairav Garhi Temple, Bhim Pakora. The Annual ‘Sharadotsava’ (Festival of Autumn) is also organized at this hill station during the autumn season. The old cemetery is in Kitchner Lines. Many war veterans have been laid to rest in the old cemetery and the graves date back to the mid-1850s.

The Garhwal Rifles Regimental Museum, also called Darwan Singh Sanghralaya, houses artefacts from the beginning of the Regiment. The Garhwal Rifles participated in the two world wars amongst other battles through its more than 100 years of history. Many artifacts, including photographs, arms used by regimental commanders, captured weapons, campaign history and other information are displayed. There are  medals won by erstwhile Garhwal Rifle soldiers, that have been put on display, including the Victoria Cross awarded to Darwan Singh Negi and Gabar Singh Negi.

How to reach Lansdowne
It is the nearest hill station to Delhi and can be reached by either road or train. The nearest railway station is Kotdwar at a distance of 44 km situated at an elevation of 370 m.  Since Lansdowne is more than 1,300 m higher than Kotdwara, the drive from Kotdwara to Lansdowne is quite steep and scenic.

The nearest airport is Jolly Grant Airport, near Dehradun at a distance of 152 km via the Kotdwar-Haridwar road.

Another route to Lansdowne is by road from Delhi via Meerut, Bijnore, Najibabad, Kotdwar and on to Lansdowne. It saves about 50 km. With the opening of Delhi-Merrut Expressway the road quality is mostly good. The Garhwal Rifles have painted a huge signboard with directions on rocks at the right-hand turn from the NH-119 that leads to Lansdowne. Lansdowne is 83 km from Pauri and about 250 km from Delhi.

Nearby places 
Tarkeshwar Mahadev Temple with its Shivalinga and a Kund (a small pond) known as Gauri Kund is situated 39 km from Lansdowne.  People take bath in Gauri Kund before entering the temple.  Two other temples, Durga Devi Temple and Jwalpa Devi, which are on the Pauri-Kotdwar road are 24 km and 47 km away respectively. Durga Devi Temple is one of the oldest Siddha Pithas in India.

Kanvashram, is situated 14 km from Kotdwar railway station. Shakuntala, wife of King Dushyanta and deserted by him, is said to have given birth to Bharata in the Ashram of Rishi Kanva in ancient India. India got its name 'Bharat' in Sanskrit after Bharata became king following the death of his father.

Demographics
 India census, Lansdowne had a population of 7902. Males constitute 64% of the population and females 36%. Lansdowne has an average literacy rate of 86%, higher than the national average of 74%: male literacy is 91%, and female literacy is 79%. In Lansdowne, 9% of the population is under 6 years of age.

References

External links

 Lansdowne Cantonment Board

Cantonments of India
Cantonments of British India
L
Cities and towns in Pauri Garhwal district